NTV Spor is a Turkish online sports platform. NTV Spor used to be a nationwide TV channel between 2008 and 2018. As of April 2021, NTV Spor continues to produce content via their website and YouTube channel.

NTV Spor used to hold  broadcasting rights of varied sports events including La Liga, NBA, FA Cup, Wimbledon, Eurobasket, UEFA Euros and FIFA World Cup qualifying phase.

History
NTV Spor, a subsidiary of Doğuş Media Group, was launched as a web portal in June 2006. NTV Spor TV channel was launched on 17 March 2008. The channel started nationwide terrestrial broadcasting on 19 November 2008. In same year, they acquired broadcasting rights of Spanish La Liga, Italian Serie A, Argentine Primera División, NBA and NASCAR.

In 2010, NTV Spor started to air 2010–11 season of World Series Boxing of AIBA, in which a Turkish boxing team named "Istanbulls" also competed in. On 24 June 2011, the channel started HD broadcasting.

Following the strategic cooperation agreement between Doğuş Media Group and Discovery Communications signed in 2015, Discovery Communications approached to acquire NTV Sports from Doğuş Media Group, in 2018. Parties agreed terms for the transaction, which was completed in 31 January 2018. On 6 March 2018, it was announced that the channel will cease their broadcasting and it will be replaced by DMAX.

The take-over took place at 22:30 local time, right after the credits of "%100 Futbol", the weekly football punditry feature of the channel, which was aired after The Intercontinental Derby game played on 17 March 2018.

References

External links

NTV Spor at YouTube

Television channels and stations established in 2008
Television channels and stations disestablished in 2018
Defunct television channels in Turkey
Turkish-language television stations
Sports divisions of TV channels
Sports television in Turkey
Doğuş Group
Mass media in Istanbul
2008 establishments in Turkey
2018 disestablishments in Turkey